Andrey Yurievich Golovanov (born October 3, 1974, Moscow) is a Russian sports reporter and television commentator.

Biography 
In journalism since 1991, and on television   since 1994. He also worked on the canals Seven TV (2003-2010) and Eurosport-Russia. Since 1994 - a sports writer and commentator First Channel.

Its main profiling sports: football, ice hockey and figure skating. There is also a summer and winter Olympic Games, world championships in hockey (2010 and 2011) and figure skating. As a football commentator worked at five World Championships (1998, 2002, 2006, 2010, 2014) and three European championships (2000, 2008, 2012).

In 2010-2013 he was a commentator on children's programs on the TV channel Carousel.

Also collaborates with the TV channel Eurosport 1. Commented mainly on the luge. Since the fall of 2016 is one of the main commentators of the matches of the NHL on Eurosport 1.

References

External links
 Golovanov: any commentator works for himself
 Andrey Golovanov

1974 births
Living people
Russian association football commentators
Sports commentators
Russian sports journalists
Sportspeople from Moscow
Moscow State University alumni
Ice hockey commentators